The Statue of Vasupujya located at Champapur in the Indian state of Bihar, is one of the tallest statues in eastern India and the tallest statue of Lord Vasupujya in India. The statue is dedicated to Vasupujya, the twelfth Jain Tirthankara of the present cosmic age. The height of the statue is 31 ft. The statue was constructed and donated by Smt Sona Devi Sethi Charitable trust, Nagaland. Champapur is a Siddhakshetra and occupies a very significant place among the Jains. This is said to be the place where all the five kalyanaks (five auspicious events)- Garbh, Janam, Diksha, Kevalgyana and Moksh kalyanak of Tirthankara Vasupujya took place. It is said that the first tirthankar Rishabha, twenty-third Tirthankara Parshvanath and last tirthankara Mahavira had their Chaturmas (monsoon stay) at this place. Mahavira had his third and twelfth Chaturmas at this place.

Early Stages 
The statue was built in the memory of Smt Sona Devi Sethi. The main force behind the project was Shri Binod Sethi, son of Shri Phulchand Sethi and Smt Lada Devi Sethi, of Dimapur, Nagaland who wanted to fulfill the last wishes of his wife, Sona Devi Sethi, daughter of Shri Bhawarlal Jain and Smt Banarsi Devi Jain. His entire family including his two sons Dewas and Anand, and daughters Chandni and Shiwangi played an instrumental role in the project.

The stone for the statue was brought all the way from Koyra mines in Karnataka to Champapur in Bihar. The original stone weighed over a 100 tonnes and was brought by road.

Bhoomi Pujan
The Bhoomi Pujan was done in June 2012.

Carving of the statue
The carving of the statue was done immaculately by Jagdish Sharma & Co, including Mithalal and Surendra Kumar,  sculptors from Rajasthan, in Champapur itself. The carving was completed in about 14 months.

Erection  of the statue
The statue was lifted with the help of two cranes which were brought from nearby states.

Panch Kalyanak Mahotsav
The Panch Kalyanaka Pratistha Mahotsav of the statue was held from 27 February 2014 to 3 March 2014. The Pancha Kalyanak Pratistha Mahotsav was conducted by Muni Shri 108 Shri Punya Sagarji Maharaj, Peethadeesh Swami Shri Ravindra Keertiji with the blessings of Ganini 105 Shri Gyanmati Mataji, a disciple of 108 Shri Shantisagar ji Maharaj and Acharya Shri 108 Vardhmansagar ji Maharaj.The chief Pratishtachari(Priest) of the Panch Kalyanak was Shri Vijay Kumar Jain.
The Suri Mantra was said by Muni Shree 108 Shri Punya Sagarji Maharaj. The first ever Mahamastakabhisek of the statue was performed on 3 March 2014.

Gallery

See also

 God in Jainism
 Arihant (Jainism)
 Jainism and non-creationism
 Vasupujya

References

External links
 
 

Vasupujya
Jain rock-cut architecture
Jain temples in Bihar
21st-century Jain temples
Statues in Bihar
West Champaran district
Year of establishment missing